Buenavista is a municipality in the south-central part of the department of Quindío, Colombia. It is known and named for the spectacular view over the department.

In 2005 it had an estimated population of 5,800, of which 2,100 live in the urban center. It is the smallest municipality by population in Quindío.

Geography 
Buenavista is situated in the western slopes on the central Cordillera and is characterized by its steep terrain. It is bounded to the north and west by Calarcá, to the east by Córdoba with the Verde River forming the limit, and to the south by Pijao. It has an area of 41 km², the smallest municipality in the department.

History 
Among the first settlers in the region was José Jesús Jiménez Yépez in 1928, who opened a store to buy coffee from the surrounding fincas and to sell basic supplies. The nearby farmers bought lots of land in the area around the store and constructed their homes there, forming a small settlement. Gerardo Loaiza donated the land to form the principal park.

The official foundation date is considered to be 1933. In that year a police inspector was assigned to the settlement. Jiménez donated land for further development, including the site on which the church was constructed.

In 1936 the settlement was elevated to the level of a town (corregimiento) in the municipality of Pijao. On December 10, 1966, shortly after the formation of the department of Quindío, the municipality was separated from Pijao.

Further reading 
 Esaquin, 2002, Datos y estadísticas generales -
Information in Spanish on the water and waste water infrastructure in eight municipalities in Quindío, including some general geographical information
 Loaiza Piedrahita, Oscar, 2004, Los corredores del tiempo: Guía turística por la historia del Quindío. . Book in Spanish on the history of the municipalities of Quindío until the foundation of the department in 1966. The local history is placed in the context of wider events in Colombia.

Municipalities of Quindío Department